Debra Leigh Stephens (née Williams; born 1965) is an American jurist and an Associate Justice of the Washington Supreme Court. She was appointed to the court in December 2007 by Governor Christine Gregoire and took office on January 1, 2008. She was elected by voters in 2008 and re-elected in 2014 and 2020.  Prior to her appointment, Justice Stephens served as a judge for Division Three of the Washington Court of Appeals and as an adjunct professor at Gonzaga University School of Law.  She is the first judge from Division Three of the Court of Appeals to serve on the Washington State Supreme Court, and the first woman from Eastern Washington to do so.

Biography

Early life and education 
Debra Leigh Williams grew up in Spokane, Washington. She graduated from West Valley High School, where she was student body president and a national "Century III Leader."  In 2012, she was inducted into its alumni Hall of Fame. She graduated from Gonzaga University and taught speech communication and coached the debate team at Spokane Falls Community College before entering Gonzaga University School of Law as a Thomas More Scholar.  She earned her J.D. degree with honors, graduating summa cum laude in 1993.

Career 
After completing law school, Stephens served as a staff attorney for the Honorable Frederick L. Van Sickle, United States District Court for the Eastern District of Washington from 1993-1995. Stephens then went into private practice.  From 1995 until April 2007 she helped coordinate the Amicus Curiae Program of the Washington State Trial Lawyers Association Foundation.  She also taught federal and state constitutional law, community property, appellate advocacy, and legal research and writing as an adjunct professor for Gonzaga University School of Law.

In 2007, she was appointed and then elected as a judge for Division Three of the Washington Court of Appeals.  Judge Stephens was then appointed to the Washington State Supreme Court effective January 1, 2008.  She was then elected in 2008 to the Washington Supreme Court and re-elected in 2014.

In October 2018, Stephens concurred when the majority abolished the state's death penalty because they found its racist imposition violated the Constitution of Washington.

On November 6, 2019, Stephens was unanimously selected to be the next Chief Justice of the Washington Supreme Court, following the retirement of Mary Fairhurst.

Stephens was re-elected as an associate justice in 2020. She was succeeded as Chief Justice by Steven C. González on January 11, 2021.

Marriage and children 
Justice Stephens and her husband, Craig, have been married since 1989, and have two children.

References

External links
Washington Courts - Justice Debra L. Stephens

|-

1965 births
Living people
21st-century American judges
21st-century American women judges
American Presbyterians
Chief Justices of the Washington Supreme Court
Gonzaga University faculty
Gonzaga University School of Law alumni
Lawyers from Spokane, Washington
Politicians from Spokane, Washington
Justices of the Washington Supreme Court
Women chief justices of state supreme courts in the United States
American women academics